Chocolat Bonnat is a French chocolate manufacturer based in the small town of Voiron.  Established in 1884 by Felix Bonnat, the business has been handed down from generation to generation.  The current Maitre-Chocolatier is Stephane Bonnat.

See also
 List of bean-to-bar chocolate manufacturers

External links
 Official Chocolat Bonnat homepage

Food manufacturers of France
Food and drink companies established in 1884
French companies established in 1884
Companies based in Auvergne-Rhône-Alpes
French brands